Jean Calhoun (April 1, 1891 – August 25, 1958) was an American film actress whose career was most prolific during the silent film era. She was a descendant of Martin Jenkins Crawford (March 17, 1820 – July 23, 1883), an antebellum U.S. Representative and a representative to the Provisional Confederate Congress during the American Civil War from the state of Georgia.

Filmography

The Man Who Woke Up (1918)
High Tide (1918)
The Winning Girl (1919)
The Feud (1919)
Thieves (1919)
When a Man Loves (1919)
The False Code (1919)
The Splendid Sin (1919)
The Exquisite Thief (1919)
Alias Mike Moran (1919)
Officer 666 (1920)
His Own Law (1920)
The Phantom Melody (1920)
R.S.V.P. (1921)
Three Sevens (1921)
The Cub Reporter (1922)
The Glory of Clementina (1922)
Two Kinds of Women (1922)
The Gangster (1947) Minor Role (uncredited) 
Caged (1950) Inmate (uncredited)

References

Bibliography

External links

 Jean Calhoun image at University of Washington Libraries
 https://www.ancestry.com/family-tree/person/tree/60243152/person/34207982062/facts

1891 births
1958 deaths
American film actresses
American silent film actresses
Actresses from Georgia (U.S. state)
20th-century American actresses